The 2022–23 ECHL season is the 35th season of the ECHL. The regular season began on October 21, 2022, and is scheduled to end on April 16, 2023, with the Kelly Cup playoffs to follow. Twenty-eight teams in 20 states and two Canadian provinces are scheduled to play 72 games.

League business

League changes

Coaching changes

Team changes 
The league added a new expansion team, the Savannah Ghost Pirates in Savannah, Georgia.

Affiliation changes

Annual Board of Governors meeting
Beginning the 2022–23 ECHL season, The Board of Governors approved utilizing a two-referee system for 25 percent of all League regular-season games during the 2022–23 Season. Each team will play nine home games where the two-referee system is used.

All-star game
The 2023 All Star Game was held on January 16, 2023, in Norfolk Scope Arena, home arena of the Norfolk Admirals.

Standings

Eastern Conference

Western Conference

 – clinched playoff spot,  – clinched regular season division title,  – Brabham Cup (regular season) champion

References

External links
ECHL website

 
2022-23
3
3